David Bergman may refer to:
 David Bergman (journalist) (born 1965), British journalist based in Bangladesh
 David Bergman (American writer) (born 1950), American writer and English professor
 David Bergman (baseball) (born 1981), Dutch baseball player